Everlasting Regret is a 2005 Hong Kong film directed by Stanley Kwan, and produced by Jackie Chan. It is based on Wang Anyi's 1995 novel The Song of Everlasting Sorrow, about a woman's turbulent life in 20th century Shanghai.

The film participated in the 62nd Venice International Film Festival and was shown at the 41st Chicago International Film Festival.

Cast
Sammi Cheng – Wang Qiyao
Tony Leung Ka-fai – Cheng Shilu (Mr. Cheng)
Hu Jun – Li Zhongde (Director Li)
Daniel Wu – Kang Mingxun
Huang Jue – "Old Colour"
Su Yan – Jiang Lili
Huang Yi – Weiwei
Yumiko Cheng – Zhang Yonghong
Wu Jing – Wang Qiyao's mother
Lan Yan (as extra)

See also
Jackie Chan filmography

External links

2005 films
2005 drama films
Films based on Chinese novels
Films set in Shanghai
Films set in the 1940s
Films set in the 1950s
Films set in the 1960s
Films set in the 1970s
Hong Kong drama films
2000s Mandarin-language films
Films directed by Stanley Kwan
Films based on works by Wang Anyi
2000s Hong Kong films